The 1954 Arundel and Shoreham by-election was held on 9 March 1954.  It was held due to the resignation of the incumbent Conservative MP, William Cuthbert.  It was retained by the Conservative candidate, Henry Kerby.

Results

Previous result

References

By-elections to the Parliament of the United Kingdom in West Sussex constituencies
1954 elections in the United Kingdom
1954 in England
20th century in Sussex
Arundel
Shoreham-by-Sea
March 1954 events in the United Kingdom